The Colonial Model C-1 Skimmer was an American small single-engined amphibian flying boat built by the Colonial Aircraft Corporation. It was the start of a line of very similar aircraft designed by David Thurston.

Design and development
In 1946 David Thurston established the Colonial Aircraft Corporation at Sanford Maine to build his design for a small amphibian flying boat, the Skimmer.

The resulting design was an all-metal shoulder-wing cantilever monoplane with a single-step hull and stabilizing floats fitted under each wing. A retractable tricycle landing gear allowed land operation. The Avco Lycoming engine with a pusher propeller was pylon-mounted above and aft of the enclosed cockpit.

The cabin had side-by-side seating for a pilot and passenger with room behind for another passenger.

The prototype XC-1 Skimmer first flew on July 17, 1948, powered by a  Lycoming O-235 engine, but was later re-engined with a  Lycoming O-290 engine.

24 examples of the C-1 Skimmer were built and these were followed by 18 examples of the higher powered four-seat variant known as the C-2 Skimmer IV, which through a succession of companies became the Lake Buccaneer.

Specifications (C-1)

See also

References

Further reading

1940s United States civil utility aircraft
Amphibious aircraft
Single-engined pusher aircraft
Skimmer
Shoulder-wing aircraft
Aircraft first flown in 1948
Flying boats
Cruciform tail aircraft